Hofford is a surname of English origin, being a variant of the surname Offord. Notable people with the surname include:

Jim Hofford (born 1964), Canadian former professional ice hockey defenceman
John Hofford (1863-1915), American professional baseball player

See also
Offord